Stanley Elphinstone Kerr (March 30, 1894 – December 14, 1976) was an American humanitarian, clinical biochemist and educator.

Life and career

Stanley Kerr was the son of a Presbyterian minister and was an inactive member of the Army. A clinical biochemist at Walter Reed Hospital, he left the United States in 1919 to serve as a volunteer for Near East Relief, an American charity created to help the Armenians. Kerr began his service in Aleppo during an Armenian refugee crisis when many of the survivors of the Armenian genocide had escaped. He worked as a medical and sanitary officer who cared for the survivors of the march of refugees through the desert. He also worked to recover Armenian children from the Kurdish and Turkoman families into which they had been forced.

In 1921 Stanley and Elsa Reckman joined the staff of a Near East Relief orphanage for Armenian children at Nahr Ibrahim, Lebanon.  One of the Armenian refugees was as a flower girl in their wedding in 1922. The orphanage was abandoned in 1923 due to a typhoid outbreak.

After Stanley earned his Ph.D. in biochemistry in 1925 from the University of Pennsylvania, he and Elsa returned to the Middle East where he accepted the position of chairman of the Department of Biochemistry at the American University of Beirut. Elsa Kerr also served on the AUB faculty as Dean of Women students. They had four children: Marion, Dorothy, Douglas, and Malcolm H. Kerr.

In 1965, following 40 years of faculty service, Stanley retired with the rank of Distinguished Professor. In recognition of his service, the Republic of Lebanon conferred upon him its Order of Merit and its National Order of the Cedar (Chevalier rank). He and Elsa retired to Princeton, New Jersey.

Kerr published The Lions of Marash in 1973. Some have deemed that book as "practically required reading for Armenians" since it is a firsthand account of the massacre of the Armenian population in Western Armenia.

Stanley Kerr died in 1976.

He was the father of Malcolm H. Kerr, former president of the American University of Beirut, and the grandfather of NBA player, general manager, broadcaster, and coach Steve Kerr.

References

External links
Google Books sample of Stanley Kerr's The Lions of Marash.
Kerr mentioned in Google Books sample of "Starving Armenians" page 92.
A selection of Stanley Kerr's papers relating to his work with the Near East Relief are held by the Zoryan Institute

1976 deaths
American expatriate academics
Academic staff of the American University of Beirut
Witnesses of the Armenian genocide
Recipients of the Order of Merit (Lebanon)
Knights of the National Order of the Cedar
20th-century American physicians
1894 births